Todd Oliynyk is a professor in mathematics at Monash University in Melbourne, Australia. He works in the area of mathematical relativity and partial differential equations. In 2011, he was awarded the Australian Mathematical Society Medal. He received a Fulbright Senior Scholarship in 2017.

References

Year of birth missing (living people)
Living people
Academic staff of Monash University
20th-century Australian mathematicians
21st-century Australian mathematicians